Jackie Haas is a Republican member of the Illinois House from the 79th district since her appointment on December 8, 2020. The 79th district, located mostly in the Chicago area, includes all or parts of Aroma Park, Beecher, Bonfield, Bourbonnais, Braceville, Bradley, Buckingham, Cabery, Chebanse, Coal City, Diamond, East Brooklyn, Essex, Gardner, Godley, Herscher, Hopkins Park, Irwin, Kankakee, Limestone, Momence, Peotone, Reddick, Sammons Point, South Wilmington, St. Anne, Sun River Terrace, and Union Hill.

Early life, education, and career
Haas was born in Momence, Illinois. She was raised in Momence and attended St. Patrick's Grade School. She graduated from Bishop McNamara Catholic High School in 1984. She graduated from Valparaiso University in 1988 with a Bachelor of Social Work and graduated from the Jane Addams College of Social Work at the University of Illinois at Chicago with a Master of Social Work. She was a social worker for Riverside Medical Center. She joined the  Helen Wheeler Center for Community Health in 1994 and has served as its CEO since 2000. She was appointed to and served on the Kankakee County Board from 2018 to 2020.

Illinois House of Representatives
Haas was elected to succeed outgoing incumbent Lindsay Parkhurst. Parkhurst, resigned from the Illinois House of Representatives upon being sworn in as a judge on December 7, 2020. Previously elected in the 2020 General Election, Haas was appointed to fill the remainder of Parkhurst's unexpired term. In her official capacity as a judge, Parkhurst swore in Haas as State Representative of the 79th District on December 8, 2020.

As of July 3, 2022, Representative Haas is a member of the following Illinois House committees:

 Appropriations - Elementary & Secondary Education Committee (HAPE)
 Appropriations - Human Services Committee (HAPH)
 Health Care Availability & Access Committee (HHCA)
 Human Services Committee (HHSV)
 Immigration & Human Rights Committee (SIHR)
 Medicaid Subcommittee (HHSV-MEDI)
 Mental Health & Addiction Committee (HMEH)
 Prescription Drug Affordability Committee (HPDA)

Electoral history

Personal life
She and her husband Bill have two adult children and currently reside in Bourbonnais, Illinois.

References

External links
Representative Jackie Haas (R) at the Illinois General Assembly
Constituent Website

1960s births
21st-century American politicians
21st-century American women politicians
Living people
Republican Party members of the Illinois House of Representatives
University of Illinois Chicago alumni
Valparaiso University alumni
Women state legislators in Illinois
Year of birth uncertain